Érik Fernando Godoy (born 16 August 1993) is an Argentine professional footballer who plays as a defender.

Club career 
During his time in Argentina, Godoy made over 140 appearances scoring six goals in all competitions. Godoy signed with Vancouver Whitecaps FC on a season-long loan with an option to purchase on 9 February 2019. In the 2019 season, Godoy made 29 appearances and recorded the second-most blocks in MLS history. On 22 January 2019, the purchase option was exercised and Godoy signed permanently with the Whitecaps through 2022, with an option for 2023. On 5 August 2022, Godoy was waived by Vancouver.

References

External links
 

1993 births
Living people
Footballers from Buenos Aires
Argentine footballers
Association football defenders
Argentine Primera División players
Club Atlético Tigre footballers
Club Atlético Belgrano footballers
Club Atlético Colón footballers
Vancouver Whitecaps FC players
Major League Soccer players
Argentine expatriate sportspeople in Canada
Argentine expatriate footballers
Expatriate soccer players in Canada
Whitecaps FC 2 players
MLS Next Pro players